"T.D" is a song by American rappers Lil Yachty and Tierra Whack featuring fellow American rappers ASAP Rocky and Tyler, the Creator. It was released as the fourth track on the former's fourth studio album Lil Boat 3 (2020). The track received critical acclaim and peaked at number 83 on the Billboard Hot 100. It marks Tierra Whack’s first and only chart entry so far.

Background 
The track is Tierra Whack's first collaboration with the three other rappers, though Rocky and Tyler have collaborated multiple times before, most notably "Who Dat Boy". Yachty and Rocky have also collaborated previously, on the song "Bachelor" from the ASAP Mob's Cozy Tapes Vol. 1: Friends.

Composition 
The track samples the song "Tokyo Drift" from the Fast & Furious movie of the same name.

Critical reception 
The track received critical acclaim. Alex Zidel of HotNewHipHop called the song a "freestyle-driven banger", and said that Lil Yachty starting off "utilized the Tokyo Drift instrumental to perfection". He said that ASAP Rocky and Tyler, the Creator "dropped bars", and Tierra Whack had "some memorable lines" before Lil Yachty closed out the track. He stated that the track feels "like it was crafted in the studio with all of them trying to outclass one another", and it was "a little bit like they were assigned a group project and, for once, everyone pulled their weight". Andrew Sacher of BrooklynVegan called the song an "exciting posse cut". He said that Rocky's verse was "acid-drenched", and Tyler's verse was "a gritty, hard-hitting verse that sooner recalls his early days than his most recent album", but said that Tierra "steals the show". Robin Murray of Clash called the track a "standout" on the album.

Charts

References 

2020 songs
ASAP Rocky songs
Lil Yachty songs
Songs written by 30 Roc
Songs written by ASAP Rocky
Songs written by Lil Yachty
Songs written by Pharrell Williams
Songs written by Tyler, the Creator
Songs written by Verbal (rapper)
Tyler, the Creator songs
Motown singles